LA Originals is a 2020 documentary film directed by Estevan Oriol, written by Brian Maya and Omar Quiroga and starring Estevan Oriol and  Mister Cartoon . The premise revolves around the Los Angeles-based artists Mark Machado (Mister Cartoon) and Estevan Oriol with Latino roots.

Cast 
 Estevan Oriol
 Eminem
 Mister Cartoon
 Snoop Dogg
 Clifton Collins Jr.
 Theo Rossi
 Eric Haze
 Revok
 Wilmer Valderrama
 George Lopez
 Travis Barker
 Michelle Rodriguez
 Kobe Bryant
 Ryan Phillippe
 Tony Touch
 David Choe
 Danny Trejo
 Terry Crews 
 Jason Blum
 Brian Grazer

Release 
LA Originals was released on April 10, 2020, on Netflix.

References

External links
 
 

2020 documentary films
2020 films
Netflix original documentary films
Argentine documentary films
American documentary films
2020s English-language films
2020s American films